Henryk Breit (1906 – 1941) was a Polish philologist and journalist. Born in Lwów (modern Lviv, Ukraine), he graduated from the philological faculty of the Jan Kazimierz University. Soon afterwards, he received a doctorate at his alma mater and started professional career at the colleges in Stanisławów and then the prestigious 11th State Gymnasium in Lwów.

An active member of the Society of the Enthusiasts of the History of Lwów, he was also a tour guide and a journalist, with weekly broadcasts on Lwów and the Hutsuls. He was also the author of several books on his home town and a single ethnographic documentary on the Hutsul life (no copy survived World War II. Following the German and Soviet invasion of Poland, he was arrested and murdered in the Stanisławów prison, under unknown circumstances.

References 

1906 births
1941 deaths
Polish philologists
20th-century Polish journalists
Polish civilians killed in World War II
Polish people executed by the Soviet Union
20th-century philologists